The Pork Peninsula is a cape located in Kivalliq Region, Nunavut, Canada. It is located on Hudson Bay, 
The peninsula separates Corbett Inlet and Pistol Bay. Igloo Point is the eastern extremity of the peninsula.

History 
The spit of land was named by the residents of Rankin Inlet, commemorating an experimental chicken and pig farm established there by the Canadian government.

References 

Atlas of Canada

Landforms of Hudson Bay
Peninsulas of Kivalliq Region